Brazoria is a genus of plants in the family Lamiaceae, first described in 1845. It contains three known species, all endemic to the US state of Texas.

The name Brazoria refers to the Brazos River.

 Brazoria arenaria Lundell - southern Texas
 Brazoria enquistii M.W.Turner - central Texas
 Brazoria truncata (Benth.) Engelm. & A.Gray - south-central to east-central Texas

Formerly included:
Brazoria scutellarioides Engelm. & A.Gray = Warnockia scutellarioides (Engelm. & A.Gray) M.W.Turner - Oklahoma, Texas, Coahuila

References

Lamiaceae
Lamiaceae genera
Endemic flora of Texas